The Ipswich Logan Cricket Club is a cricket club located in Ipswich, Queensland, Australia. They play in the Queensland Premier Cricket competition, fielding teams in 1st and 2nd grade. They were founded when the Beenleigh Logan Cutters moved to Ipswich in 2012.

See also

References

External links
 

Queensland District Cricket clubs
Sport in Ipswich, Queensland
Logan City
2012 establishments in Australia
Cricket clubs established in 2012